Los Angeles Harbor Light, also known as Angels Gate Light, is a lighthouse in California, United States, at San Pedro Breakwater in Los Angeles Harbor, California.  The lighthouse is listed on the National Register of Historic Places.  It is listed as Los Angeles Light in the USCG Lights list.  It is the only lighthouse in the world that emits an emerald-colored light.

History

The original plan for the lighthouse was a wooden, square, two-story building like those constructed for Oakland Harbor and Southampton Shoals.  However, the plans were changed and the Los Angeles Light was firmly anchored to the concrete block and built of steel reinforced concrete. It is the only lighthouse ever built to this design.  The original paint on the lighthouse was only white which caused a problem with seeing the lighthouse building during fog.  Vertical black stripes were added for increased visibility.

By 2011, the years of exposure have led to rusted through walls, broken windows, cracked masonry, and leaks during storms.  In cooperation with the Coast Guard, the Cabrillo Beach Boosters Club completed a $1.8 million overhaul of the exterior, funded by the Port of Los Angeles.  The overhaul was completed in May 2012.  A $1.2 million overhaul of the interior is planned.

This lighthouse is inaccessible to the public, but can be viewed from the Cabrillo Beach area, San Pedro Breakwater or by boat.

See also

 List of lighthouses in the United States
 List of Los Angeles Historic-Cultural Monuments in the Harbor area
 National Register of Historic Places listings in Los Angeles County, California
 San Pedro Bay (California)

References

External links

 Historic Lighthouses and Light Stations in California National Park Service

1913 establishments in California
Lighthouses completed in 1913
Lighthouses on the National Register of Historic Places in Los Angeles
Los Angeles Historic-Cultural Monuments
San Pedro, Los Angeles